Megachile trichroma is a species of bee in the family Megachilidae. It was described by Friese in 1922.

References

Trichroma
Insects described in 1922